The Minister for the Environment, formally cabinet minister and head of the Ministry for the Environment, was a member and minister of the Swedish Government and was appointed by the Prime Minister. The minister headed the Ministry for the Environment and was responsible for environmental issues and construction. The minister also had the overall responsibility for coordinating the government's work on sustainable development.

The office was founded in 1987, and its first holder was Birgitta Dahl. In 2022, the newly-formed Kristersson Cabinet eliminated the separate office and placed it under the authority of the combined Minister for Energy as well as Business and Industry.

List of Ministers for the Environment

See also 
Ministry for the Environment
Government of Sweden

References

Government ministers of Sweden